Krishna Bahadur Rai (also Krishna Rai) is a Nepali politician and a member of the House of Representatives of the federal parliament of Nepal. He was elected from Kathmandu-3 constituency, representing CPN UML of the left alliance, under the first-past-the-post electoral system. This is the first time he has been elected to parliament. He defeated his nearest rival Ambika Basnet of Nepali Congress by acquiring 19,169 votes to Basnet's 14,884.

References

Living people
Place of birth missing (living people)
Communist Party of Nepal (Unified Marxist–Leninist) politicians
Nepal Communist Party (NCP) politicians
Nepal MPs 2017–2022
1969 births